|}

The Wild Flower Stakes is a Listed flat horse race in Great Britain open to horses aged three years or older.
It is run at Kempton Park over a distance of 1 mile 3 furlongs and 219 yards (2,413 metres), and it is scheduled to take place each year in late November or early December.

The race was first run in 2007.

Records
Most successful horse (2 wins):
 Dansant – 2007, 2008

Leading jockey (2 wins):
 Eddie Ahern – Dansant (2007, 2008)
 Tom Marquand -  Spark Plug (2018), Pablo Escobarr (2019)
 Jamie Spencer - Les Fazzani (2009), Belloccio (2022)

Leading trainer (2 wins):
 Gerard Butler -  Dansant (2007, 2008)

Winners

See also
 Horse racing in Great Britain
 List of British flat horse races

References
Racing Post: 

Kempton Park Racecourse
Flat races in Great Britain
Open middle distance horse races
2007 establishments in England
Recurring sporting events established in 2007